Estonian Fencing Federation (abbreviation EFF) is one of the sport governing bodies in Estonia which deals with fencing.

EFF is established on 2 December 1989 in Tallinn. EFF is a successor of Estonian SSR Fencing Federation which was established in 1948. EFF is a member of International Fencing Federation (FIE).

References

External links
 

Sports governing bodies in Estonia
Fencing in Estonia
National federations of the European Fencing Confederation
Sports organizations established in 1948